Louis Mouton (born 3 June 2002) is a French professional footballer who plays as a midfielder for  club Saint-Étienne.

Career 

Originally a youth player at ES Veauche, Mouton joined Saint-Étienne's academy in 2013. During the 2021–22 season, he was an integral member of the club's reserve team in the Championnat National 3. On 17 June 2022, Mouton signed his first professional contract with Saint-Étienne, a one-year deal. He made his professional debut as a substitute in a 2–1 Ligue 2 defeat away to Dijon on 30 July. On 20 August, Mouton made his first start for Saint-Étienne in an eventual 6–0 home defeat to Le Havre. He scored his first professional goal in a 2–2 draw away to Pau on 5 September.

Personal life 
Louis's younger brother Jules, born in 2005, is also a Saint-Étienne youth player.

References

External links  
 

2002 births
Living people
French footballers
Association football midfielders
AS Saint-Étienne players
Championnat National 3 players
Ligue 2 players